Phoebe Di Tommaso (born 26 July 1990 in Brisbane) is an Australian former competitive figure skater who won the senior national title in the 2010–11 season. She made her senior international debut at the 2007 Four Continents Championships in Colorado Springs, Colorado; she qualified for the free skate and finished 21st overall.

Di Tommaso also competed at three other Four Continents and the 2005 World Junior Championships but did not reach the final segment.

Programs

Competitive highlights
JGP: Junior Grand Prix

References

External links
 
 
 Tracings.net profile

Australian female single skaters
1990 births
Living people
Sportswomen from Queensland
Sportspeople from Brisbane